Vampires of Black Imperial Blood is the debut album by French black metal group Mütiilation. The album is noted for being the first full length release in the Les Légions Noires movement, it was also the first full-length CD publication from Drakkar Productions, a French record label freshly established in 1994 by fellow musician Noktu (frontman of Celestia).

Reissues
Originally limited to 1000 copies, the album was reissued in 1999 as a double-LP by End All Life Productions, in a limited pressing of 100 numbered copies. This edition had a slightly different track listing, including three bonus tracks. The album was bootlegged in 2005 by Tragic Empire Records, in an undisclosed amount, with the same track listing as the double-LP. In 2009 Dark Adversary Productions (Australia) did an official reissue of this album with the same track listing as the original CD press.

Critical reception

This album, together with March to the Black Holocaust, was instrumental in establishing the reputation of the Black Legions among underground black metal circles. The overall reception of the album was highly polarized with some dismissing it as "forgettable melancholic drivel". Globally, the most notable elements appear to be the "twisted", "demented but catchy riffs" and, most importantly, the "melancholic", "bleak and lugubrious", "depressive atmosphere", that differed from the established Norwegian black metal acts of that time. On the base of this album, Mütiilation is often credited for inventing the "depressive/suicidal black metal" subgenre, that would spawn acts such as Xasthur and Shining. However, unlike groups the album influenced, "Vampires..." shows a wider range of dynamics and an unmistakable style of songwriting, especially for that era of the genre.

While the production quality has been acclaimed as "significantly clearer" than on earlier Mütiilation demos, other reviewers described it as a "nonexistent production", 
or even an "ultra primitive sound quality (...) making Darkthrone sound downright hi-fi".

Track listings

Drakkar Original Pressing/Dark Adversary Pressing

End All Life LP

Trivia
 This was the first recording to feature Mørdrëd.
 This album features both real drums as well as a drum machine, while on the following Mütiilation releases (notably ones that were recorded as a one-man project) Meyhna'ch would rely solely on a drum machine. The final Mütiilation album, Sorrow Galaxies, also featured actual drums.

References

1995 debut albums
Les Légions Noires albums
Mütiilation albums